Nasdrovia is a Spanish comedy thriller television series created by Miguel Esteban, Luismi Pérez and Sergio Sarria, which stars Leonor Watling and Hugo Silva. Its first season aired on Movistar+ in 2020.

Premise 
The story follows two lawyers, Edurne (Leonor Watling) and Julián (Hugo Silva) - business partners and former spouses both suffering from a midlife crisis - who decide to make a change in their lives and open a restaurant, operated by Franky (Luis Bermejo). It soon becomes the favourite of Boris (Anton Yakovlev), and thus the characters become embroiled in a relationship with the Russian mafia in Madrid.

Cast 
 Leonor Watling as Edurne.
 Hugo Silva as Julián.
 Luis Bermejo as Franky.
  as Boris.
 Mark Ivanir as Aleksei.
 Michael John Treanor as Sergei.
 Yan Tual as Vasilli.
 Kevin Brand as Yuri.

Production and release 
Nasdrovia is based on the 2016 novel El hombre que odiaba a Paulo Coelho,  by Sergio Sarria. The series is produced by Movistar+ in collaboration with Globomedia (The Mediapro Studio).

Created by Miguel Esteban, Luismi Pérez and Sergio Sarria, and directed by Marc Vigil, the first season consisted of 6 episodes with a running time of around 30 minutes. Filming took place in Madrid, Spain in the summer of 2019. The series premiered on Movistar+ on 6 November 2020, with two episodes airing per week. In December 2020, Movistar+ announced the show would be renewed for a second season. Filming started in March 2021 in Bulgaria (which was used to portray the setting in Russia) and wrapped in April 2021. Shooting locations in Spain included Madrid and Avilés (Asturias).

Awards and nominations 

|-
| align = "center" | 2021 || 8th Premios Feroz || colspan = "2" | Best Comedy Series ||  || 
|}

References

External links 
 

2020 Spanish television series debuts
2020s Spanish comedy television series
Spanish thriller television series
Television shows filmed in Spain
Movistar+ network series
Television series about organized crime
Spanish crime television series
Works about the Russian Mafia
2020s crime television series
Television series based on Spanish novels
Spanish-language television shows
Television shows set in Madrid
Television shows filmed in Bulgaria
Spanish crime comedy television series
Television series by Globomedia